Nebria deuveiana is a species of ground beetle from Nebriinae subfamily that is endemic to Turkey.

References

deuveiana
Beetles described in 1990
Beetles of Asia
Endemic fauna of Turkey